Ahmed Rachedi may refer to:

Ahmed Rachedi (film director)
Ahmed Rachedi, Algeria -a commune in Algeria
 Ahmed Rachedi is an alternate transliteration for Ahmed Errachidi, a former Guantanamo captive from Morocco